Larry Allen Abshier (1943 – July 11, 1983) was one of six American soldiers to defect to North Korea after the Korean War. He was born in Urbana, Illinois.

Defecting
Private Abshier, a member of the 1st Reconnaissance Squadron, 9th Cavalry, 1st Cavalry Division, abandoned his post in South Korea in May 1962 when he crept away from his base and crossed the DMZ into North Korea.  He was, for three months, the only American in the Democratic People's Republic of Korea, until Private James Joseph Dresnok defected in August.

In the 2006 documentary movie Crossing the Line, Dresnok recalls waking up to see a white face looking at him. "I opened my eyes. I didn't believe myself. I shut them again. I must be dreaming. I opened them again and looked and said, 'Who in the hell are you?' He says, 'I'm Abshier.' 'Abshier? I don't know no Abshier.'"

Abshier and three other American defectors, James Joseph Dresnok, Charles Robert Jenkins, and Jerry Wayne Parrish, starred in several films like Unsung Heroes, playing evil Americans. Their participation in these films made them instant celebrities. Abshier and the other three became a propaganda bonanza, and photographs were leaked outside the country of the four living in utopian North Korea; the men always appeared successful, carefree, and happy.

Life in North Korea
Charles Jenkins wrote in his book The Reluctant Communist that Abshier had difficulty conversing in Korean but was fascinated by words and would spend hours studying vocabulary from newspapers. Jenkins reported that the four were moved into a one-room house in Mangyongdae-guyok in June 1965, where they lived together for several years, reading and memorizing passages by Kim Il Sung. Jenkins asserted that Dresnok would bully Abshier at this time, for example, by making a mess and then demanding that Abshier clean it up. Abshier was sympathetically characterized by Jenkins as "a simple, sweet, good-hearted soul who was more than a little dumb and easy to take advantage of."

For a time, Dresnok and Parrish pejoratively called Abshier "Lennie" after the simpleton from John Steinbeck's novel Of Mice and Men. Abshier never stood up to the bullying until convinced to do so by Jenkins. Eventually, Dresnok "made a move" on Abshier, but Jenkins defended him by beating Dresnok, after which Dresnok transferred his animosity to Jenkins. Abshier, like Dresnok, Parrish, and Jenkins, was "given" a North Korean woman to be his cook and minder, and to have sex with him. These women were thought to be infertile, having all divorced after a number of years of childless marriage. When Abshier's woman became pregnant, however, she was taken away.

Later, Abshier married another woman. In Crossing the Line, Dresnok claims she was Korean, but in The Reluctant Communist, Jenkins claims she was a Thai woman named Anocha Panjoy who was given to Abshier by the North Korean government. Jenkins claims she was a former prostitute who had been working as a masseuse in Macau when she was abducted by North Korean agents and brought to North Korea. Shortly thereafter, in 1978, she was "given" to Abshier. Jenkins' account of her abduction was greeted with incredulity, until he produced a photograph of her in North Korea, suggesting that North Korea may have abducted citizens of other countries in addition to those of Japan. They had no children. After Abshier's death, Anocha was taken away, allegedly to marry an East German entrepreneur in 1989.

Death
Abshier died suddenly, shortly after midnight on July 11, 1983, at the age of 40 from a heart attack in Pyongyang. Jenkins wrote that he and Abshier were neighbors at the time, and Abshier's wife, Anocha, called on him for assistance at the time of the incident. By the time Jenkins arrived, Abshier was beyond rescue and soon died. His funeral was funded by the state and relatively well-serviced.

See also

List of American and British defectors in the Korean War: the 21 Americans and 1 Briton who refused repatriation during Operation Big Switch in 1953 (to remain in China)
Roy Chung, deserted in June 1979
Joseph T. White (1961–1985) of St Louis, Missouri, deserted in August 1982 at age 20

Notes

References

External links
Joe Dresnok, An American in North Korea, 2007
TIMEasia Magazine: From Hell With Love, 2005

1943 births
1983 deaths
People from Urbana, Illinois
American defectors
American expatriates in North Korea
Prisoners and detainees of North Korea
United States Army soldiers
Korean people of American descent
Korean people of British descent
Military personnel from Illinois